Morteza Shiri (born 12 June 1962) is an Iranian boxer. He competed in the men's heavyweight event at the 1992 Summer Olympics.

References

1962 births
Living people
Iranian male boxers
Olympic boxers of Iran
Boxers at the 1992 Summer Olympics
Place of birth missing (living people)
Heavyweight boxers
Sportspeople from Tehran